Deng Yu-cheng (born 25 April 1999) is a Taiwanese archer. He competed with Wei Chun-heng and Peng Shih-Cheng in the 2017 Summer Universiade and won silver in the Recurve Men's Team event. He competed in the men's individual event and also won silver in the men's team event at the 2020 Summer Olympics.

References

External links
 

1999 births
Living people
Taiwanese male archers
Olympic archers of Taiwan
Archers at the 2020 Summer Olympics
Place of birth missing (living people)
Medalists at the 2020 Summer Olympics
Olympic medalists in archery
Olympic silver medalists for Taiwan
Medalists at the 2017 Summer Universiade
Universiade silver medalists for Chinese Taipei
Universiade medalists in shooting
21st-century Taiwanese people